The Play-offs of the 2011 Fed Cup Americas Zone Group II were the final stages of the Group II Zonal Competition involving teams from the Americas. Using the positions determined in their pools, the seven teams faced off to determine their placing in the 2011 Fed Cup Americas Zone Group II. The top two teams advanced to Group I for the next year.

Promotion play-offs
The first placed teams of each pool played against the second-placed teams of the other pool in head-to-head rounds. The winner of each round advanced to the 2012 Americas Zone Group I.

Guatemala vs. Bahamas

Uruguay vs. Venezuela

5th to 6th play-off
The third placed teams of each pool played in a head-to-head round to find the fifth and sixth placed teams.

Puerto Rico vs. Ecuador

7th to 8th play-off
The fourth placed teams of each pool played in a head-to-head round to find the seventh and eighth placed teams.

Costa Rica vs. Dominican Republic

9th to 10th play-off
The last placed teams of each pool played in a head-to-head round to find the ninth and tenth placed teams.

Trinidad and Tobago vs. Panama

Final Placements

Both teams were sent to the relegation play-offs, and met in their play-off tie. The Venezuelans won, and thus remained in Group I for 2013 while the Bahamians were relegated back to Group II.

See also
Fed Cup structure

References

External links
 Fed Cup website

2011 Fed Cup Americas Zone
Sport in Santo Domingo
Tennis tournaments in the Dominican Republic
International sports competitions hosted by the Dominican Republic